Sehi Bey (Ottoman Turkish: Sehî Bey), (1471?–1548) was an Ottoman poet and bibliographer. He was the first one to compile a tezkire (bibliographical dictionary of poets and poetry), a genre which would have many followers until the 19th century.

Sehi Bey was born in Edirne. Together with his friend, poet Necati (d.1509), he served as katib (secretary) to Princes Şehzade Mahmud, son of Bayezid II, and Süleyman, the later would become known as Suleiman the Magnificent. He was in charge of many waqfs located in Edirne and Ergene, being a chief trustee, in Turkish mütevelli.
He is mostly remembered for the tezkire, Heşt Behişt (Eight Springs), which he finished in 1538. 2 other editions would follow until 1548. It narrated the work and life of 241 poets and was very well received and supported by the Ottoman high social circles. It served as basic source for later study of Ottoman poetry.

Sehi Bey did work also on his own poetry, collected in a diwan.
He died in 1548 (955 in Islamic calendar).

See also
Aşık Çelebi
Kastamonulu Latifî Çelebi
Ahdi of Baghdad

References

Divan poets from the Ottoman Empire
People from Edirne
Male poets from the Ottoman Empire
1471 births
1548 deaths
15th-century people from the Ottoman Empire
16th-century writers from the Ottoman Empire
Turkish-language poets